The Delfield Company is a United States commercial food service equipment manufacturer specializing in food holding equipment including serving lines, refrigerators, prep tables and custom manufactured equipment. Delfield is a part of The Manitowoc Company, and one of the members of its Food Service Group.

The Delfield Company has locations in Mount Pleasant, MI, and Covington, TN, and is the third-largest employer in greater Mount Pleasant, following Soaring Eagle Casino and Central Michigan University.

See also
Foodservice Equipment Distributors Association

References

External links

Companies based in Michigan

Food manufacturers of the United States
Manufacturing companies of the United States